A waterfall is a place where water flows over a vertical drop in the course of a river.

Waterfall may also refer to:

Places
 Waterfall, New South Wales, Australia
 Waterfall, Ontario, Canada
 Waterfall, County Cork, Ireland
 Waterfall, Alaska, United States
 Waterfall, Virginia, United States
 Waterfall Village, Pentecost Island, Vanuatu
 Waterfalls, Harare, Zimbabwe
 Waterfall station (disambiguation), several railway stations

Business and finance
 Waterfall model, in project management for business and software
 Cash flow waterfall, a securitization arrangement in finance
 Distribution waterfall, the process by which returned capital is distributed in private equity and real estate funds

Infographics and visualization
 Waterfall display or spectrogram, to visualize sonar operation, animal calls, and other sounds
 Waterfall display (hardware), used in smartphones
 Waterfall chart, a kind of floating column bar chart
 Waterfall plot, a 3D plot of the information on a spectrogram, resembling mountain ranges

Arts and entertainment
 Waterfall (M. C. Escher), a 1961 paradoxical lithograph print by Escher
 Waterfall furniture, a design style closely related to Art Deco

Music

Albums
 Waterfall (album), a 1972 album by If
 Waterfall (B.I album), 2021
 Waterfalls (album), a 1972 album by John Klemmer
 Waterfall, a 1994 album by Atlantic Ocean

Songs
 "Waterfall" (Carly Simon song), 1975
 "Waterfall" (James song), 2008
 "Waterfall" (Sopho Gelovani & Nodiko Tatishvili song), 2013
 "Waterfall" (Stargate song), 2017
 "Waterfall" (The Stone Roses song), 1991
 "Waterfalls" (Paul McCartney song), 1980
 "Waterfalls" (Timomatic song), 2013
 "Waterfalls" (TLC song), 1995
 "Waterfall", by 10cc, 1972
 "Waterfall", by Adler from Back from the Dead
 "Waterfall", by Atlantic Ocean, 1993
 "Waterfall", by Charli XCX from XCX World
 "Waterfall", by Electric Light Orchestra from Face the Music
 "Waterfall", by Gabry Ponte from his eponymous album, 2002
 "Waterfall", by Heavenstamp, 2011
 "Waterfall", by Jon Schmidt
 "Waterfall", by Joy and the Boy from Paradise
 "Waterfall", by Kim Waters from Someone to Love You
 "Waterfall", by Toby Fox, a track from the soundtrack of the 2015 video game Undertale
 "Waterfall", by Wendy & Lisa from Wendy and Lisa
 "May This Be Love", also known as "Waterfall", by The Jimi Hendrix Experience from Are You Experienced

People
 Arnold C. Waterfall (1914–1990), British philatelist
 Linda Waterfall (born 1950), American folk musician and singer-songwriter
 Luke Waterfall (born 1990), English footballer

Other uses
 Operation Waterfall, a World War II Allied deception
 Waterfall bong, a type of bong used to smoke marijuana

See also
 Falling water (disambiguation)
 Vattenfall, a Swedish power company
 Wasserfall, a World War II guided surface-to-air missile
 Waterval, a residential township in South Africa